Kollaa may refer to:
 Kollaa, river in Russia
 1929 Kollaa, asteroid
 Battle of Kollaa, between Finland and the Soviet Union during the Winter War (1939-1940)